Kenneth Cameron may refer to:

 Kenneth D. Cameron (born 1949), former NASA astronaut
 Kenneth Cameron, Baron Cameron of Lochbroom (born 1931), retired Scottish judge
 Kenneth Cameron (academic) (1922–2001), British toponymist and academic
 Ken Cameron (trade unionist) (1941–2016), Scottish trade union leader
 Kenneth Cameron (wrestler), English professional wrestler
 Ken Cameron (born 1946), Australian film and television director
 Ken Cameron (Australian footballer) (1934–2005), Australian rules footballer
 Ken Cameron (Scottish footballer) (1906–1974)
 Kenny Cameron (born 1943), Scottish footballer and football coach, scout, and manager